Kanawa Land Vehicles, subtitled "Wheels for the Possibility Wars", is a supplement published by West End Games (WEG) in 1992 for the multi-genre role-playing game Torg.

Contents
Kanawa Land Vehicles lists various vehicles available for use in a Torg campaign or adventure with descriptions and game statistics.

Publication history
WEG published the multi-genre role-playing game Torg in 1990, and followed up with a variety of supplements and adventures, including 1992's Kanawa Land Vehicles, designed by Nigel Findley, with interior artwork by Rob Caswell, Stephen Crane, Cathleen Hunter, John Paul Lona, Francis Mao, and Tom Peters, and cover art by Erik Van der Palen.

Reception
In the April 1993 edition of Dragon (Issue 192), Rick Swan found Kanawa Land Vehicles "disappointing... Kanawa doesn’t manage anything more interesting than an armored carriage or a Chevrolet Sportvan." He concluded that it was "A curiously flat effort."

Reviews
White Wolf #33 (Sept./Oct., 1992)

References

Role-playing game supplements introduced in 1992
Torg supplements